Dahiana Monserrat Bogarín Giménez (born 13 November 2000) is a Paraguayan footballer who plays as a midfielder for the Paraguay women's national team.

International career
Bogarín has represented Paraguay at the 2016 South American U-17 Women's Championship, the 2016 FIFA U-17 Women's World Cup, the 2018 South American U-20 Women's Championship and the 2018 FIFA U-20 Women's World Cup. She made her senior debut on 7 November 2019, in a 1–2 home friendly loss to Argentina.

Personal life
Bogarín has a brother, Rodrigo Bogarín, who has represented Paraguay at men's under–17 and under–20 levels.

References

External links

2000 births
Living people
Paraguayan women's footballers
Women's association football forwards
Women's association football midfielders
Cerro Porteño players
Maccabi Kishronot Hadera F.C. players
Ligat Nashim players
Paraguay women's international footballers
Paraguayan expatriate women's footballers
Paraguayan expatriate sportspeople in Israel
Expatriate women's footballers in Israel
21st-century Paraguayan women